Sinurothoe is a genus of crustaceans belonging to the monotypic family Sinurothoidae.

The species of this genus are found in China Sea.

Species:

Sinurothoe armatus 
Sinurothoe sinensis

References

Amphipoda